Cokodeal is a marketplace e-commerce service that connects traders in Africa to the world. It is headquartered in Nigeria with reg no: 1165256. The service helps connect African traders and customers. With Cokodeal, individual users, organizations and businesses can create online stores to market African manufactured goods and services. Its founders partnered with Neoteric, a UK enterprise, to handle its development and support. Presently, its major trading is in Ghana, Nigeria, Tanzania, South Africa, and Kenya. Cokodeal is an avenue for African traders to meet global customers and make deals.

History
Cokodeal was founded in 2012 by Mike Dola and launched in 2014. It used Nigeria as an entry point to Africa, then expanded to other African countries.

cokodeal.com took part in the US$1 million SpeedUPAfrica bootcamp held in Accra, hosted by DraperDarkFlow, 500startups, Singularity University.

Invention
Cokodeal created a pan-Africa commodity bank, as a platform that alleviates the challenges faced by people in Europe and other parts of the world in finding African traders and African produced goods and services. It aims to find businesses, products, goods and location.

Uniqueness
Cokodeal is designed to promote solely African local content, i.e. African manufactured goods and services such as agricultural products, textile, crafts, art works, machines, and minerals. Cokodeal facilitates African traders meeting customers, and connects African traders to Africa and global markets. It aims to solve some social challenges and enables SMEs and businesses to leverage on its platform to save cost and reach new markets. It serves as a market linkage for African businesses to trade internationally and develop its local content.

Nigeria business owners can market their made-in-Nigeria goods on cokodeal to access new markets. However, the platform needs improvement in its layers and design layout.

In recent economic times with the crash of oil derivatives in the global market, the diversification goal for African countries has become a core need. Cokodeal has supported government Ministries, Development and Agencies (MDAs) to get procurement by sourcing international buyers for local producers, and also for international buyers.

External links
Organization's website
Companies House 
Credit gate
Companies in the UK

References

Online retailers of Nigeria